The 1981 Austrian motorcycle Grand Prix was the second round of the 1981 Grand Prix motorcycle racing season. It took place on the weekend of 24–26 April 1981 at the Salzburgring.

Classification

500 cc

References

Austrian motorcycle Grand Prix
Austrian
Motorcycle Grand Prix
April 1981 sports events in Europe